Jaroslav Spacek (born February 11, 1974) is a Czech former professional ice hockey defenceman who played in the National Hockey League (NHL) for over 13 seasons with the Florida Panthers, Chicago Blackhawks, Columbus Blue Jackets, Edmonton Oilers, Buffalo Sabres, Montreal Canadiens and the Carolina Hurricanes.

Playing career
Špaček was drafted in the fifth round, 117th overall, by the Florida Panthers in the 1998 NHL Entry Draft.

On January 26, 2006, the Chicago Blackhawks traded Špaček to the Edmonton Oilers in exchange for Tony Salmelainen. In 2005–06, Špaček was part of the Cinderella Edmonton Oilers team that made a run to the 2006 Stanley Cup Finals. However, the Oilers lost in Game 7 of the finals to the Carolina Hurricanes. Špaček had three goals and 11 assists in the 2006 Playoffs. He was only one victory away of joining the Triple Gold Club.

On July 5, 2006, Špaček signed a three-year contract with the Buffalo Sabres. In the 2006–07 season, he helped the Sabres reach the Eastern Conference Finals. Špaček was named an alternate captain for the month of December 2007 and captain for the month of January under the Sabres 2007–08 rotating captain and alternate captains system. In the 2008–09 season, Špaček tied a career-high with 45 points in 80 games for the Sabres.

On July 1, 2009, Špaček signed a three-year contract worth $11.5 million with the Montreal Canadiens.

In the final year of his contract in the 2011–12 season, on December 9, 2011, Montreal traded Špaček to the Carolina Hurricanes in exchange for defenceman Tomáš Kaberle.

A free agent, and with the 2012–13 NHL lockout in effect well into the 2012–13 season, Špaček effectively announced his retirement on November 19, 2012. He became assistant coach for HC Škoda Plzeň and was also added to Plzeň's roster before the trade deadline. He was forced into playing again in the final series due to injuries to Plzeň's defencemen, and he helped Plzeň win its first-ever Czech Extraliga title.

In 2014, Špaček was named assistant coach for the Czech team at the 2014 IIHF World Championship.

Špaček was inducted into the Czech Ice Hockey Hall of Fame on November 3, 2016.

Career statistics

Regular season and playoffs

International

References

External links
 

1974 births
Living people
People from Rokycany
Beast of New Haven players
Buffalo Sabres captains
Buffalo Sabres players
Carolina Hurricanes players
Chicago Blackhawks players
Columbus Blue Jackets players
Ice hockey players at the 1998 Winter Olympics
Czech ice hockey defencemen
Edmonton Oilers players
Färjestad BK players
Florida Panthers draft picks
Florida Panthers players
HC Plzeň players
HC Slavia Praha players
Ice hockey players at the 2002 Winter Olympics
Ice hockey players at the 2006 Winter Olympics
Montreal Canadiens players
Olympic bronze medalists for the Czech Republic
Olympic gold medalists for the Czech Republic
Olympic ice hockey players of the Czech Republic
Olympic medalists in ice hockey
Medalists at the 2006 Winter Olympics
Medalists at the 1998 Winter Olympics
Sportspeople from the Plzeň Region
Czech expatriate ice hockey players in the United States
Czech expatriate ice hockey players in Sweden
Czech expatriate ice hockey players in Canada